The 1994 California Superintendent of Public Instruction election was held on June 7, 1994, to elect the of Superintendent of Public Instruction of California. The officially nonpartisan position is elected via a general election, with a runoff held if no candidate receives a majority of the vote. Delaine Eastin and Maureen DiMarco advanced to run the runoff, which was held on November 8, 1994 and won by Eastin.

General election

Runoff

Results

Results by county

See also
California state elections, 1994
State of California
California Department of Education

External links

VoteCircle.com Non-partisan resources & vote sharing network for Californians
Information on the elections from California's Secretary of State

1994 California elections
California Superintendent of Public Instruction elections
California